William Steig  (November 14, 1907 – October 3, 2003) was an American cartoonist, illustrator and writer of children's books, best known for the picture book Shrek!, which inspired the film series of the same name, as well as others that included Sylvester and the Magic Pebble, Abel's Island, and Doctor De Soto. He was the U.S. nominee for both of the biennial, international Hans Christian Andersen Awards, as a children's book illustrator in 1982 and a writer in 1988.

Early life
Steig was born in Brooklyn, New York, in 1907, and grew up in the Bronx. His parents were Polish-Jewish immigrants from Lemberg, Austria-Hungary; both socialists. His father, Joseph Steig, was a house painter, and his mother, Laura Ebel Steig, was a seamstress who encouraged his artistic leanings. As a child, he dabbled in painting and was an avid reader of literature. Among other works, he was said to have been especially fascinated by Pinocchio. In addition to his artistic endeavors, he also did well at athletics, being a member of the collegiate All-American water polo team. He graduated from Townsend Harris High School at 15 but never completed college, though he attended three, spending two years at City College of New York, three years at the National Academy of Design and a mere five days at the Yale School of Art before dropping out of each.

Career
Hailed as the "King of Cartoons", Steig began drawing illustrations and cartoons for The New Yorker in 1930, producing more than 2,600 drawings and 117 covers for the magazine. One of his cartoon characters, Poor Pitiful Pearl, was made into a popular line of dolls starting in 1956.

Later, when he was 61, Steig began writing children's books. In 1968, he published his first children's book. He excelled here as well, and his third book, Sylvester and the Magic Pebble (1969), won the Caldecott Medal. He went on to write more than 30 children's books, including the Doctor De Soto series, and he continued to write into his nineties. Among his other well-known works, the picture book Shrek! (1990) formed the basis for the DreamWorks Animation film Shrek (2001). After the release of Shrek 2 in 2004, Steig became the first sole-creator of an animated movie franchise that went on to generate over $1 billion from theatrical and ancillary markets after only one sequel.

When asked his opinion about the movie based on his picture book Shrek, William Steig responded: “It’s vulgar, it’s disgusting — and I loved it.”

In 1984, Steig's film adaptation of Doctor De Soto, directed by Michael Sporn, was nominated for the Academy Award for Best Animated Short Film.

Also in 1984, Steig received the CINE Golden Eagle Award in Education for the film adaptation of this book.

Personal life and death
Steig married four times and had three children. From 1936 to 1949, Steig was married to educator and artist Elizabeth Mead Steig (1909–1983, sister of anthropologist Margaret Mead), from whom he was later divorced. For a time, Steig lived at 75½ Bedford Street, purported to be the narrowest house in Manhattan.
Steig's first marriage also made him a brother-in-law of Leo Rosten and an uncle of Mary Catherine Bateson. Steig and Mead were the parents of jazz flutist Jeremy Steig (playing the Pied Piper in Shrek Forever After) and a daughter, Lucinda. He married second wife Kari Homestead in 1950, and they had a daughter, Margit Laura (now professionally known as Maggie Steig). After their divorce, he was married to Stephanie Healey from 1964 to 1966. His final marriage, to Jeanne Doron, endured for the rest of his life.

His brother Irwin was a journalist and painter, for whom William illustrated two books on poker strategy. His brother Henry was a jeweler and a writer who played the saxophone and painted. And his brother Arthur was a writer and poet, who, according to Steig, read The Nation in the cradle, was telepathic and "drew as well as Picasso or Matisse".

Steig died of natural causes in Boston, Massachusetts, on October 3, 2003, aged 95. Shrek 2, which was released seven months after his death, was dedicated to his memory.

Works
 1932, Man About Town (New York: R. Long & R.R. Smith)
 1939, About People: A book of symbolical drawings by William Steig (Random House) 
 1941, How to Become Extinct (Farrar & Rinehart), written by Will Cuppy, illustrated by Steig
 1942, The Lonely Ones (Duell, Sloan and Pearce)
 1944, All Embarrassed (Duell S&P)
 1944, Small Fry (Duell S&P)
 1945, Persistent Faces (Duell S&P)
 1946, Mr. Blandings Builds His Dream House (Simon & Schuster) by Eric Hodgins
 1947, Till Death Do Us Part: Some ballet notes on marriage (Duell S&P)
 1948, Listen, Little Man! (Orgone Institute Press) by Wilhelm Reich – translated from the German-language essay "Rede an den kleinen Mann", 1945
 1950, The Decline and Fall of Practically Everybody by Will Cuppy
 1950, The Agony in the Kindergarten (Duell S&P)
 1950, Giggle Box: Funny Stories for Boys and Girls (Alfred A. Knopf), compiled by Phyllis R. Fenner, newly illustrated by Steig
 1951, The Rejected Lovers (Knopf)
 1953, Dreams of Glory and other drawings (Knopf)
 1959, Poker for Fun and Profit (McDowell, Obolensky, 1959), written by Irwin Steig, illustrated by William Steig 
 1963, Common Sense in Poker (Cornerstone, 1963), written by Irwin Steig, illustrated by William Steig 
 1963, Continuous Performance (Duell S&P)
From this time, Steig primarily created children's picture books.
 1968, CDB! (Windmill Books) – picture book
 1968, Roland the Minstrel Pig (Windmill)
 1969, Sylvester and the Magic Pebble (Windmill) — NBA finalist
 1969, The Bad Island (Windmill); reissued as Rotten Island (D. R. Godine, 1984)

 1971, Amos and Boris
 1972, Dominic — NBA finalist
 1973, The Real Thief
 1974, Farmer Palmer's Wagon Ride
 1976, Abel's Island — adapted as a 1988 film
 1976, The Amazing Bone
 1977, Caleb + Kate — NBA finalist
 1978, Tiffky Doofky
 1979, Drawings
 1980, Gorky Rises
 1982, Doctor De Soto — National Book Award, Picture Books
 1984, CDC? (Farrar, Straus & Giroux)
 1984, Ruminations
 1984, Yellow & Pink
 1984, Rotten Island (formerly The Bad Island, 1969) 
 1985, Solomon, The Rusty Nail
 1986, Brave Irene
 1987, The Zabajaba Jungle
 1988, Spinky Sulks
 1990, Shrek! — the basis for the movie series
 1992, Alpha Beta Chowder, written by Jeanne Steig, illustrated by William Steig
 1992, Doctor De Soto Goes to Africa
 1994, Zeke Pippin
 1996, The Toy Brother
 1998, A Handful of Beans: Six Fairy Tales, retold by Jeanne Steig, illustrated by William Steig
 1998, Pete's a Pizza
 2000, Made for Each Other
 2000, Wizzil
 2001, A Gift from Zeus
 2002, Potch & Polly
 2003, When Everybody Wore a Hat

References

External links

 William Steig at publisher Macmillan US
 Obituary: William Steig 1907–2003 at The Comics Reporter
 From The New Yorker to 'Shrek: The Art of William Steig, 2007–2008 exhibition at The Jewish Museum of New York
 William Steig at Library of Congress Authorities, with 107 catalog records
 

1907 births
2003 deaths
American cartoonists
American children's writers
Caldecott Medal winners
Newbery Honor winners
American children's book illustrators
National Book Award for Young People's Literature winners
The New Yorker cartoonists
American people of Polish-Jewish descent
Writers from Brooklyn
Artists from New York City
Jewish American writers
Jewish American artists
Townsend Harris High School alumni
City College of New York alumni
National Academy of Design alumni
Yale School of Art alumni
20th-century American Jews
21st-century American Jews